Erinna is a genus of perennial herbaceous geophytes in the flowering plant family Amaryllidaceae. It is native to Chile, South America. It is included in the tribe Gilliesieae, within the subfamily Allioideae. The genus  is monotypic, with a single species, Erinna gilliesioides. It is relatively rare.

Taxonomy 
Erinna  was described by Philippi in 1864 as a monotypic genus, based on Erinna gilliesioides.  As such it was a genus within Alliaceae, and included in the phylogenetic construction of Gilliesieae in 1996. Although Ravenna (2000) proposed transferring it to Leucocoryne as Leucocoryne gilliesioides on morphological grounds, it was included separately by Chase et al. (2009) and hence the 2009 APGIII. Although the World Checklist lists Erinna as a synonym of Leucocoryne, Sassone et al. (2014) still consider its status uncertain.

In 2014 Sassone et al. proposed dividing the Gilliesieae into two separate tribes. Under their proposal, Erinna would remain in Gilliesieae s.s. rather than be transferred to the new tribe, Leucocorynae, as would be the case if transferred into Leucocoryne.

References

Bibliography 

 
 
 

 Erinna. The Plant List

Amaryllidaceae genera
Allioideae
Monotypic Amaryllidaceae genera